The 2013–14 Liga Nacional Superior de Voleibol Femenino (Spanish for: 2013-14 Women's Senior National Volleyball League) or 2013-14 LNSVF was the 12th official season of the Peruvian Volleyball League. Universidad San Martín won the league championship.

Competing teams

  Alianza Lima (ALI)
  Universidad César Vallejo (UCV)
  Circolo Sportivo Italiano (CSI)
  Unión Vallejo Tarapoto (UVT)
  Géminis (GEM)
  Divino Maestro (CDM)
  Latino Amisa (LAT)
  Regatas Lima (CRL)
  Universidad San Martín (USM)
  Sporting Cristal (SCR)
  Túpac Amaru (TUP)
  Wanka Surco (WKA)

Competition format

First round
The first round is a Round-Robyn system where all 12 teams will play once against the other 11.

Pool standing procedure

1. Match points
2. Numbers of matches won
3. Sets ratio
4. Points ratio

Match won 3–0 or 3–1: 3 match points for the winner, 0 match points for the loser
Match won 3–2: 2 match points for the winner, 1 match point for the loser

Ranking.

Matches

First Round, December 11 - February 23 
The first round consisted of 40 matches, with an average of six matches per week. Teams played seven matches during this round except for four teams that only played six.

Second round
The second round of the tournament will see the best 8 teams from the first round compete in another Round-Robyn system, according to the finishing will be the play-offs. It began March 5, 2014 .

Pool standing procedure

1. Match points
2. Numbers of matches won
3. Sets ratio
4. Points ratio

Match won 3–0 or 3–1: 3 match points for the winner, 0 match points for the loser
Match won 3–2: 2 match points for the winner, 1 match point for the loser

Ranking

Second Round, March 05 - April 04 
The second round consisted of 28 matches, with an average of six matches per week. Teams played seven matches during this round except for four teams that only played six.

Consolation round
The consolation round of the tournament, will see the 4 losing from the first round compete in another Round-Robyn system, the best team will continue with their remaining. It began March 5, 2014.

Pool standing procedure

1. Match points
2. Numbers of matches won
3. Sets ratio
4. Points ratio

Match won 3–0 or 3–1: 3 match points for the winner, 0 match points for the loser
Match won 3–2: 2 match points for the winner, 1 match point for the loser

Ranking

Consolation round, March 16–23 
The consolation round consisted of 6 matches. Teams played two matches during this round.

Final round
The final round of the tournament is a knockout stage, teams play the quarterfinals seeded according to how they finished ranking-wise in the second round. This round is played best-out-of-three games, for a team to move on to the next stage, they have to win twice against the opposite team.

Quarterfinals

First leg

Second leg

Semifinals

First leg

Second leg

Bronze Medal Matches

First leg

Second leg

Gold Medal Matches

First leg

Second leg

Final standing

Jadranka Budrovic,
Daniela Uribe,
Patricia Soto,
Milca Da Silva,
Leslie Leyva,
Yulissa Zamudio (C),
Elizabeth Millan,
Zoila La Rosa,
Andrea Urrutia,
Ángela Leyva,
Janice Torres (L)
Zaira Manso,

Awards

All-Star Team

Most Valuable Player
 Milca Da Silva (Universidad San Martín)
Best Outside Hitters
 Karla Ortiz (Sporting Cristal)
 Carla Rueda (Géminis)
Best Setter
 Zoila La Rosa (Universidad San Martín)
Best Opposite
 Maguilaura Frias (Sporting Cristal)
Best Middle-Blockers
 Wivian Gadelha (Géminis)
 Clarivett Yllescas (Universidad César Vallejo)
Best Libero
 María de Fátima Acosta (Géminis)

Individual awards

Best Scorer
 Milca Da Silva (Universidad San Martín)
Best Spiker
 Maguilaura Frias (Sporting Cristal)
Best Blocker
 Wivian Gadelha (Géminis)
Best Server
 Jeoselyna Rodríguez (Universidad César Vallejo)
Best Digger
 María de Fátima Acosta (Géminis)
Best Setting
 Shiamara Almeida (Sporting Cristal)
Best Receiver
 Susan Egoavil (Sporting Cristal)

References

External links
LNSV
Voleibol.pe

2013 in women's volleyball
2014 in women's volleyball
2013 in Peruvian women's sport
2014 in Peruvian women's sport
Volleyball competitions in Peru